Maria Teresa Baldini (born 22 January 1961) is an Italian politician from Italia Viva. She was formerly a basketball player and surgeon.

She was a member of the Italy women's national basketball team.

She was a candidate for Fuxia People in the 2016 Milan municipal election.

She was a candidate in the 2022 Italian presidential election.

References 

Living people
1961 births
Deputies of Legislature XVIII of Italy
21st-century Italian women politicians
People from Pietrasanta
Forza Italia (2013) politicians
Italian surgeons
Italian women's basketball players
Italy national basketball team players
Sportspeople from the Province of Lucca
Women members of the Chamber of Deputies (Italy)